The 2020 Faroe Islands Cup was the 66th edition of Faroe Islands domestic football cup. It started on 27 June and ended on 5 December. Havnar Bóltfelag were the defending champions, having won their twenty-seventh cup title the previous year and successfully defended their title.

Only the first teams of the participating clubs were allowed to enter the competition.

Round and draw dates

Preliminary round

First round

Quarterfinals

Semifinals

Final

See also
2020 Faroe Islands Premier League
2020 1. deild
2020 2. deild

References

Faroe Islands Cup seasons
2020 domestic association football cups
2020 in Faroe Islands football